Burlington Mall may refer to the following shopping malls:

 Burlington Mall (Massachusetts) in Burlington, Massachusetts, USA
 Burlington Centre (formerly Burlington Mall) in Burlington, Ontario, Canada

See also:
 Burlington Center Mall in Burlington Township, New Jersey, USA
 Holly Hill Mall and Business Center (formerly Burlington Square Mall), Burlington, North Carolina, USA
 Burlington Town Center (formerly Burlington Square Mall) in Burlington, Vermont, USA